Charles Henry Reardon (January 2, 1916 – October 13, 1986) was a Canadian politician. He represented the electoral district of Halifax West in the Nova Scotia House of Assembly from 1956 to 1963. He is a member of the Nova Scotia Liberal Party. Reardon was born in Halifax, Nova Scotia. He was a doctor, having received his medical degree at Dalhousie University.

On May 15, 1942, he married Barbara Evelyn McArel. He died on October 13, 1986, at a hospital in Halifax.

References

1916 births
1986 deaths
Nova Scotia Liberal Party MLAs
People from Halifax, Nova Scotia
Dalhousie University alumni